Yan Luo may refer to:

In Chinese mythology Yan Luo is the ruler of hell, see Yama (East Asia)
Luo Yan (screenwriter), Chinese born screenwriter, producer, and actress